The Nisbet Grammer was a lake freighter that served on the North American Great Lakes from her commissioning in 1923 until her sinking in 1926.

Sinking

She sank on May 26, 1926, after the Dalwarnic, a freighter of similar size collided with her.
The Dalwarnics bows pierced one of her holds, but all her crew were rescued.

The Nisbet Grammer had reduced her speed to half-speed. Still, the vessels were too close to avoid a collision when they sighted one another in reduced visibility of the fog bank.

Location
The exact location of her wreck was unknown for 88 years, until an expedition found it off Somerset, New York.  Researchers searched for the wreck for six years. The wreck is the largest steel-hulled shipwreck in Lake Ontario.

References

Shipwrecks of Lake Ontario
Ships sunk in collisions
Great Lakes freighters
1923 ships
Maritime incidents in 1926
Ships built in England
Shipwrecks of New York (state)